Deutzianthus is  a genus of trees, from the family Euphorbiaceae. It was first described as a genus in 1924. They are found in Vietnam, southern China, and Sumatra.

Species
 Deutzianthus thyrsiflorus (Airy Shaw) G.L.Webster - Sumatra
 Deutzianthus tonkinensis Gagnep. - Yunnan, Guangxi, Vietnam

References

Euphorbiaceae genera
Jatropheae